Antonio Cuba (born 10 December 1914, date of death unknown) was a Peruvian sprinter. He competed in the men's 100 metres at the 1936 Summer Olympics.

References

External links
 

1914 births
Year of death missing
Place of birth missing
Athletes (track and field) at the 1936 Summer Olympics
Peruvian male sprinters
Olympic athletes of Peru